St. Peter's Protestant Episcopal Church, Berkeley in Clarksboro is a historic church on King's Highway in the Clarksboro section of East Greenwich Township, Gloucester County, New Jersey, United States.

St. Peter's was founded in Berkeley (now Mount Royal, NJ) in 1770 by the Society for the Propagation of the Gospel, the missionary arm of the Church of England. The current church was built in 1845 and added to the National Register of Historic Places in 1977.

See also
National Register of Historic Places listings in Gloucester County, New Jersey

References

Churches completed in 1843
19th-century Episcopal church buildings
Episcopal church buildings in New Jersey
Churches on the National Register of Historic Places in New Jersey
Churches in Gloucester County, New Jersey
National Register of Historic Places in Gloucester County, New Jersey
1770 establishments in New Jersey
New Jersey Register of Historic Places
East Greenwich Township, New Jersey